C11orf49 is a protein coding gene that in humans encodes for the C11orf49 protein. It is heavily expressed in brain tissue and peripheral blood mononuclear cells, with the latter being an important component of the immune system. It is predicted that the C11orf49 protein acts as a kinase, and has been shown to interact with HTT (determining protein for Huntington's disease) and APOE2 (risk protein for Alzheimer's).


Gene

Aliases 
Common aliases are UPF0705, FLJ22210, and MGC4707.

Location 
C11orf49 is found at locus p11.2 on human chromosome 11, with a plus strand orientation. The gene is 224,830 bp long including introns, and spans from position 46,936,806 to 47,161,635 on chromosome 11.

Transcript Variants 
There are 7 known transcript variants for the mRNA of C11orf49, with variant 2 encoding for the most complete protein. Variant 1 lacks a 3’ splice junction, which results in a truncated 3’ terminus compared to variant 2. Variant 3 contains an alternate splice site at the 3’ end, which lacks an internal region near the 3’ terminus compared to variant 2. Variant 4 has an alternate 3’ terminus exon, resulting in a truncated 3’ terminus compared to variant 2. Variant 5 lacks an exon in the 5’ coding region which results in an upstream start codon, and has alternate splice site near the 3’ region. This results in a distinct N-terminus and a missing internal region near the 3’ terminus compared to variant 2. Variants 6 and 7 are both represented as candidates for nonsense-mediated mRNA decay (NMD), and do not encode for viable proteins.

Table 1. Known human mRNA transcript variants for C11orf49.

Protein

Isoforms 
There are 5 known isoforms for the C11orf49 protein with isoform 2 being the most complete protein, encoded by transcript variant 2. 

Table 2. Known human protein isoforms for C11orf49.

Composition 
The C11orf49 protein has a molecular weight of 38.1 kD, and an isoelectric point of about pH = 5. Protein composition falls under normal levels for each amino acid, and there are no conserved repeats, patterns, or charged clusters to be seen. There are no hydrophobic or transmembrane regions to be seen.

Protein Domain 
The C11orf49 protein is predicted to contain a protein kinase domain near the N' terminus (residues 12-51)

Secondary Structure 
Secondary structure prediction tools such as Ali2D, Phyre2, and i-Tasser all predict that the C11orf49 protein is mostly composed of alpha helices, with no predicted beta sheets. Information on where these alpha helices are located can be seen to the right of the page.

Tertiary Structure 
i-Tasser predicted tertiary structure is included to the right of the page.

Post-Translational Modifications

Phosphorylation 
The C11orf49 protein is predicted to be phosphorylated at 4 different sites, mainly on serine residues, but also on one threonine residue.

Table 3. Predicted phosphorylation sites for the C11orf49 human protein.

Sumoylation 
The C11orf49 protein is predicted to be sumoylated at positions 119 and 320, both lysine residues.

Subcellular Localization 
The C11orf49 protein found in humans is predicted to be localized in the cytoplasm.

Gene Level Regulation

Promoters 

There are 7 promoters listed on Genomatix, however only one of the promoters (GXP_204543) starts at the beginning of the C11orf49 gene that is found in humans, and also has the greatest number of encoding transcripts.

Table 4. List of promoters associated with the C11orf49 human gene.

Transcription Factors 

The following transcription factors are predicted to bind to the GXP_204543 promoter.  The higher the matrix score, the more likely the transcription factor is to bind to the promoter. Information on where these transcription factors bind on the GXP_204543 promoter is showcased in the image to the right of the page.

Table 5. List of binding transcription factors to the GXP_204543 promoter.

Gene Expression

Tissue Specific Expression 

Both microarray expression patterns and RNA-Seq data show very high levels of expression in the brain. RNA-Seq data also shows high expression in lung fetal tissue. Additional information for other tissues is included to the right of the page.

Conditions of Differentiated Expression 
C11orf49 expression is significantly increased after the overexpression of claudin-1 in lung adenocarcinoma cell lines. Claudin-1 specifically prevents paracellular diffusion of small molecules through tight junctions in the epidermis.

C11orf49 expression is significantly decreased after the treatment of camptothecin on a renal epithelial cell line. Camptothecin is an alkaloid that inhibits the nuclear enzyme DNA topoisomerase, and has exhibited antitumor activity. It has also shown the ability to cause apoptosis by changing the permeability of the mitochondrial membrane, releasing cytochrome C.

Post-Transcription Regulation

5' UTR 
There is a predicted stem-loop structure in the 5' UTR of the C11orf49 transcript from nucleotides 15-26 shown to the right of the page.

3' UTR 
There are predicted stem-loop structures and miRNA binding sites for the 3' UTR of the C11orf49 transcript shown to the right of the page.

Protein-Protein Interactions 
The database provided by PSICQUIC indicates that the C11orf49 protein found in humans interacts with the following proteins listed in Table 6. All interactions were determined using two-hybrid screening experiments.

Table 6. List of proteins that interact with the C11orf49 protein found in humans.

Homology and Evolution

Orthologs and Paralogs 
C11orf49 can be found among a wide variety of taxonomic groups, including but not limited to Mammalia, Aves, Reptilia, Amphibia, Cyprinidae, Hemichordata, Cnidaria, Platyhelminthes, Arthropoda, Placozoa, Choanoflagellate, Spizellomyces, and Oomycota. However, C11orf49 could not be found in Insecta or Plantae. There are no known paralogs of C11orf49.

Table 7. List of selected orthologs of C11orf49.

Evolution

History 
Saprolegnia diclina is the most distantly related ortholog of C11orf49 known, with its divergence from ancestral humans approximately 1,552 MYA.

Evolutionary Rate 
After performing a molecular clock analysis, C11orf49 has evolved at a faster rate than Cytochrome c but slower than Fibrinogen alpha. The graph containing this analysis is to the right of the page.

Function

Protein Kinase Activity 
C11orf49 is predicted to act as a cAMP-dependent protein kinase.

Clinical Significance 
C11orf49 has been shown to interact with proteins HTT and APOE2, which are associated with Huntington's disease and Alzheimer's, respectively. Due to the predicted function of C11orf49, this interaction could be kinase-oriented.

C11orf49 expression is significantly increased after the overexpression of Claudin-1 in lung adenocarcinoma cells.

C11orf49 expression is significantly decreased after the treatment of camptothecin on a renal epithelial cell line.

References